Situ is one of the more common surviving Chinese compound surnames. It is also spelled in Wade–Giles as Ssŭtu or in the Mathews system as Szŭtu, and romanised from Cantonese as Szeto, Seto, or Sitou, or from Taishanese as Soohoo. It originates from the ancient Chinese title Situ, which can be translated as "Minister over the Masses". The surname is common in Guangdong province, particularly around Kaiping.

Statistics
According to data from the Sixth National Population Census of the People's Republic of China in 2010, Situ was China's fourth-most common compound surname, behind Ouyang, and Huangfu. The census found roughly 45,000 bearers of the surname. However it is not among the top 400 surnames overall in China.

The following table presents statistics for more common spellings of this surname in the United States, according to the United States Census. The Hanyu Pinyin spelling Situ became more common between 2000 and 2010, while Szeto, Seto, and Soohoo remained at roughly the same rankings during that time period. Other spellings such as Ssutu, Szutu, Sitou, and Seetoo occurred fewer than 100 times in census data. Some of these spellings may also correspond to non-Chinese surnames; for example, Seto is also a Japanese surname (written in kanji as ).

People

 
People with this surname include:
Situ Qiao (1902–1958), Chinese oil painter
Situ Huimin (1910–1987), Chinese film director
Situ Guong (1911–?), Chinese Olympic long jumper
Szeto Wai (1913–1991), Hong Kong engineer and architect
Szeto Wah (1931–2011), Hong Kong politician
Da-Hong Seetoo (born 1960), Chinese-born American recording engineer and violinist
Sitoh Yih Pin (born 1963), Singaporean politician
Antony Szeto (born 1964), Australian director, martial artist, actor, stunt coordinator
Szeto Kam-Yuen (1964–2012), Hong Kong screenwriter
Andy Seto (born 1969), Hong Kong comic artist
Carwai Seto (born 1973), Canadian swimmer who represented Taiwan at the 1988 Summer Olympics
Szeto Man Chun (born 1975), Hong Kong football manager
Hayden Szeto (born 1985), Canadian television actor
Nikki SooHoo (born 1988), American television actress
Brandon Soo Hoo (born 1995), American television actor
Dixon Seeto, Fijian businessman
Karen Seto, American geographer

References

Further reading

Chinese-language surnames
Individual Chinese surnames